Chondrodactylus angulifer, also known as the common giant ground gecko, the South African ground gecko, or the Namib sand gecko, is a species of gecko, a lizard in the family Gekkonidae. The species is endemic to southern Africa.

Geographic range
Chondrodactylus angulifer is found in Namibia, southernmost Botswana, and western South Africa.

Description
Chondrodactylus angulifer is a large gecko. Adults average  snout-to-vent length (SVL). The record size is a male  SVL.

Reproduction
An adult female C. angulifer may lay a clutch of one or two eggs. The eggs are almost spherical, . Each hatchling is approximately  total length (including tail).

Subspecies
There are two subspecies which are recognized as being valid, including the nominotypical subspecies.
Chondrodactylus angulifer subsp. angulifer 
Chondrodactylus angulifer subsp. namibensis

References

Further reading
Haacke WD (1976). "The burrowing geckos of southern Africa, 4 (Reptilia: Gekkonidae). Annotated taxonomic account (cont.) E. Genus Chondrodactylus Peters". Annals of the Transvaal Museum 30: 53–70. (Chondrodactylus angulifer namibensis, new subspecies).
Peters W (1870). "Beitrag zur Kenntnis der herpetologischen Fauna von Südafrika ". Monatsberichte der Königlich Preussischen Akademie der Wissenschaften zur Berlin 1870: 110–115. (Chondrodactylus angulifer, new species, p. 111). (in German and Latin).

Chondrodactylus
Reptiles described in 1870
Taxa named by Wilhelm Peters